Nargelene Mendez is a Filipina national, and was formerly a domestic worker in Arabia.  Mendez has made allegations that she was forced to labor under inhumane slave-like working conditions, until her October rescue by a Philippine diplomatic worker.  Mendez's Facebook documentation of her working conditions under her Arabian employers, which to viewers may seem to have been akin to de facto forced migrant slavery, aroused worldwide journalistic condemnation.  Mendez documented claims of the physical abuse and neglect that her employers had subjected her to, including beatings, a "sleeping berth" in a laundry room cupboard, and the refusal of her employers to return her passport to her.  Mendez's self-documented Facebook story received nearly half a million hits.  In October the Philippine Embassy informed the BBC that Mendez had been rescued from her employers, but that the Embassy was still involved in negotiations with the Arabian government to arrange for her safe exit of the country.  One month on, as of 27 November 2014, Mendez remains trapped in the Philippine Consulate of Jedda, with the Philippine government still unable to secure from the Arabian government, her safe return to the Philippines.  Nonetheless, she still hopes for her safe return home sometime before Christmas.

References 

Filipino expatriates in Saudi Arabia
Human rights abuses in Saudi Arabia
Living people
Year of birth missing (living people)
Filipino domestic workers
Filipino migrant workers
Violence against women in Saudi Arabia